State Savings Bank, also known as Harrison Mutual Insurance Association, is a historic building located in Logan, Iowa, United States.  Founded in 1888, the bank built this building in 1902.  It is a two-story brick structure with terra cotta ornamentation.  Its wrap-around design is made possible for this mid-block building by its alley location.  State Savings Bank was one of four banks that operated in the town over its history.  It failed in 1923. After the building sat empty for five years Harrison Mutual Insurance Association purchased the building.  It was listed on the National Register of Historic Places in 1985.

References

Commercial buildings completed in 1902
Buildings and structures in Harrison County, Iowa
National Register of Historic Places in Harrison County, Iowa
Bank buildings on the National Register of Historic Places in Iowa